SOX12 is a protein that in humans is encoded by the SOX12 gene. Sox12 belongs to the SoxC group of Sox family of transcription factors, together with Sox4 and Sox11. Sox12-null knockout mice appear normal, unlike Sox4 or Sox11 knockout mice. This probably comes from functional redundancy with Sox4 and Sox11. Sox12 is a weaker activator than both Sox4 and Sox11 in mouse.

Members of the SOX family of transcription factors are characterized by the presence of a DNA-binding high mobility group (HMG) domain, homologous to the HMG box of sex-determining region Y (SRY). Forming a subgroup of the HMG domain superfamily, SOX proteins have been implicated in cell fate decisions in a diverse range of developmental processes. SOX transcription factors have diverse tissue-specific expression patterns during early development and have been proposed to act as target-specific transcription factors and/or as chromatin structure regulatory elements. The protein encoded by this gene was identified as a SOX family member based on conserved domains and its expression in various tissues suggests a role in both differentiation and maintenance of several cell types.

References

Further reading

Transcription factors